Paramount Media Networks (founded as MTV Networks in 1984 and known under this name until 2011) is an American mass media division of Paramount Global that oversees the operations of many of its television channels and online brands. Its related international division is Paramount International Networks.

The division's original namesake, MTV, is managed through a subsidiary called MTV Entertainment Group.

History

Pre-launch: Warner Communications joint venture (1977–1984) 
Warner Cable Communications was founded on December 1, 1977, by Warner Cable, itself a division of Warner Communications, to launch QUBE, an interactive cable television network. Seeing the potential in the creation of new cable networks, Warner Cable divested QUBE's biggest brands, Star Channel, Pinwheel and Sight on Sound, into nationwide outlets. Star Channel began by satellite in January 1979 and was renamed The Movie Channel by the end of the year. The original Channel C-3, by then known as Pinwheel, became Nickelodeon in April 1979. As a result of these actions, Warner Cable Communications would then be rebranded as Warner-Amex Satellite Entertainment, becoming a joint venture between Warner Cable and American Express.

In 1980, Warner-Amex formed a joint venture with Cablevision's Rainbow Media division to launch Bravo, a cable network dedicated to arts and films, on December 1, 1980. Full control of the channel, however, was sold to Rainbow Media in 1984; NBC would acquire Bravo in 2003, and the channel is now currently owned by Comcast's NBCUniversal.

On August 1, 1981, Sight on Sound was relaunched as MTV.

In 1983, concerned by the strategic and financial failure of its pay-TV venture The Movie Channel (started to reap the benefits Time Inc. was having with HBO and Cinemax), WASEC established a joint venture with Viacom, merging TMC with their premium movie network Showtime to form Showtime/The Movie Channel, Inc.; WASEC, however, had no operational involvement in the joint venture.

Launch as MTV Networks, Viacom gets full ownership (1984–2011) 
On June 25, 1984, Warner Communications made the decision to divest Nickelodeon, MTV, and VH-1 (launched in 1985; Warner acquired it from Turner) into a new public corporation called MTV Networks. A year later, Warner would acquire the 50% stake from American Express.

On August 27, 1985, Warner sold 31% of MTV Networks to Viacom, with Warner also selling 19% of its Showtime/The Movie Channel, Inc. joint to Viacom as well.

In November 1985, Viacom bought the remaining 69% of MTV Networks from Warner for $326 million, The acquisition was completed on May 20, 1986, causing Viacom to instantly become a mass media company rather than simply a distributor.

In 2003, MTV Networks assumed full ownership of Comedy Central from AOL Time Warner.

In January 2006, the remnants of MTV Networks and Showtime Networks were separated following Viacom's split into two entities: CBS Corporation, which retained CBS, UPN, Simon & Schuster and Showtime Networks (Showtime, The Movie Channel, and Flix), and a spun-off company under the Viacom name, which took ownership of Paramount Pictures, BET Networks and MTV Networks (Comedy Central, MTV, Nickelodeon, and VH1). MTV Networks was renamed Viacom Media Networks in 2011.

Expansion (2011–2019) 
In the fall of 2012, media analysts began to report that ratings among some of Viacom's leading brands in the U.S. were experiencing declines in viewership. MTV, Comedy Central and Nickelodeon were of most concern to investors as the three account for roughly 50% of Viacom's operating profit, estimated David Bank of RBC Capital Markets.

In 2017, Viacom announced a five-point restructuring plan, in which the company would pour most of its resources behind six "flagship brands". These were MTV, Comedy Central, Nickelodeon, Nick Jr., BET, and Paramount Pictures. In February 2017, cable channels CMT and TV Land were moved from the Kids and Family Group to the Global Entertainment Group under Kevin Kay, joining up with Spike TV. During the same month, it was announced that Spike would be relaunched as Paramount Network in 2018, aligning with the namesake film studio and being positioned as Viacom's main general entertainment outlet.

In October 2018, Kevin Kay was announced to be leaving his position as head of the Entertainment Group. CMT was transferred from the Entertainment Group to the Music Group under president Chris McCarthy, with his exit. Executive Kent Alterman would take charge of Paramount Network and TV Land to go with his current leadership of Comedy Central and Bellator MMA.

In 2019, after acquiring the free streaming service Pluto TV, Viacom would launch several channels on the service branded after its Media Networks and company–owned IP.

Reintroduction and re-merger with CBS (2019–present) 
In August 2019, Viacom announced that it would merge with CBS Corporation, reuniting the two entities under the new name ViacomCBS. The merger closed in early December 2019. Announced on November 11, 2019, as part of the re–merger, the Media Networks division was renamed ViacomCBS Domestic Media Networks, and reorganized. MTV, VH1, CMT and Logo were reorganized into the "Entertainment & Youth Group", with the addition of Comedy Central, Paramount Network, Smithsonian Channel, and TV Land. BET Networks was merged with Showtime Networks under CEO David Nevins, who also temporarily gained oversight of Pop TV (formerly co-owned with Lionsgate); Pop TV was transferred to the Entertainment & Youth Group on January 15, 2020. On February 16, 2022, ViacomCBS was renamed as Paramount Global, and ViacomCBS Domestic Media Networks was renamed Paramount Media Networks.

Channels list

Current channels

Former channels and blocks 
 BET Networks (moved under CBS Entertainment Group)
 Bravo (sold to Rainbow Media in 1984; later purchased by General Electric's NBC Entertainment division in 2003, and NBCUniversal a year after)
 C-3 (officially launched as Nickelodeon, in 1988, the "Pinwheel" block replaced with the "Nick Jr." block)
 Sight on Sound (officially launched as MTV in 1981)
 Nick GAS ((1999–2007), 2009 (on Dish Network)); replaced by the 24-hour The N on cable, DirecTV and more with Turner's Cartoon Network (West feed) on Dish Network)
 VH1 Uno (2000–2008); became MTVU, focusing on music videos aimed at college-aged students.
 NickMom (2012–2016), late-night block, focusing on mothers.
 Noggin (TV Channel) (1999–2009); replaced by the Nick Jr. Channel in 2009, but relaunched with the "Noggin" streaming app in March 2015
 TEENick (Nickelodeon block) (2001–2009)); merged brand with "The N" to form TeenNick
 The N (Noggin block) (2002–2007), channel (2007-2009); merged brand with "TEENick" to form TeenNick
 NickRewind (2011–2022), classic-oriented, late-night block on TeenNick
 SNICK (1992–2005)
 Nick on CBS/Nick Jr. on CBS (2000–2006)
 Showtime Beyond (1999–2020), became SHO×BET focusing on African-American actors in film.
 MTVX, became MTV Jams in 2002, focusing on hip-hop music, rebranding under the BET banner in October 2015.
 VH121 (moved under BET Networks)
 VH1 MegaHits, became Logo TV in 2005, focusing on cultural gay themes.

Notes 
1Channel was originally launched under Warner-Amex Satellite Entertainment and tested as Sight on Sound until 1981, when it officially launched as MTV.

2Channel started as Ha!, merged with HBO's The Comedy Channel the following year, became entirely owned by Viacom in 2003.

3Originally TNN from 1983 to 2003 (as The Nashville Network until 1997; as The National Network until 2003) and as Spike until January 2018.

4Channel was originally known as VH1 MegaHits before being discontinued in July 2005 to facilitate Logo launch.

5Channel was previously owned by Gaylord Entertainment Company, acquired in 1997 by the CBS Cable division of CBS Corporation, and became part of MTV Networks when CBS merged with Viacom.

6Channel created as VH1 Country before Viacom/CBS merger.

7Channel was originally launched under Warner-Amex Satellite Entertainment and tested as Pinwheel until 1979, then was officially launched as Nickelodeon.

8Channel space was previously held by Noggin (a joint venture with Sesame Workshop) before being replaced with the Nick Jr. Channel in 2009.

9Channel was originally known as MTV Hits before being rebranded as NickMusic on September 9, 2016.

10Channel was originally known as Nicktoons TV until 2003 when it was rebranded as Nicktoons which was rebranded again as Nicktoons Network in 2005 and finally rebranded yet again as Nicktoons (styled as “nicktoons”) once more in 2009.

11Channel space was previously held by Nickelodeon Games and Sports for Kids from 1999 to 2007, and a 24-hour version of Noggin's The N brand from 2007 to 2009.

12Channel originally owned by the first incarnation of Viacom, and earlier with former partner Warner-Amex, and later became part of CBS Corporation following Viacom's split in 2006. Showtime was established in 1976, and The Movie Channel was established in 1973 as Star Channel and relaunched under its current name in 1979.

13Channel was originally co-owned by CBS Corporation through Showtime Networks and the Smithsonian Institution until November 7, 2019, when the Institution sold its equity interest to Showtime.

14Channel was originally a block on Nick at Nite.

15Previously owned by CBS Corporation, and before 2019, half of the share was owned by Lionsgate. Formerly known as TVGN, TV Guide Network, and TV Guide Channel.

16Established by Viacom's Showtime Networks in 1992 and later became part of CBS Corporation following Viacom's split in 2006.

17Channel was formerly Showtime Beyond from 1999 and was discontinued on July 15, 2020.

18Channel was originally known as "Star Channel" until it was bought by Warner-Amex Satellite Entertainment before becoming "The Movie Channel" in 1979.

19Channel was originally known as VH1 Smooth before being relaunched as VH1 Classic Rock on August 1, 1999. The channel was renamed VH1 Classic in 2000 and was later rebranded as MTV Classic on August 1, 2016.

20Channel was originally known as Music: High Definition (MHD) before being rebranded as Palladia on September 1, 2008. On February 1, 2016, the channel was rebranded as MTV Live.

21Channel was originally a division of Warner Communications and the original owner of MTV, and launched on January 1, 1985, in the former space of Turner's short-lived Cable Music Channel.

22Channel slot was originally VH1 Uno, until MTV Networks on Campus replaced VH1 Uno with a televised simulcast of MTVU. The college campus feed of MTVU no longer exists but the public feed is still on a limited amount of MSOs.

Other properties

Internet 
Through its Networks division, Paramount also owns internet properties, such as MTV News and AwesomenessTV. The company ran a virtual world system, Virtual MTV, in the late 2000s.

The company has owned various other internet properties including virtual pets website Neopets; Flash game websites AddictingGames.com and Shockwave.com; online content production company Atom Entertainment; along with RateMyProfessors.com, GameTrailers, and iFilm, all of which have been shut down or sold off during 2000s and 2010s.

During the first quarter of 2008, iFilm was merged into Spike with its website re–branded and re–purposed as Spike.com.

In 2014, Viacom purchased a stake in multi-channel network Defy Media, while offloading GameTrailers, Addicting Games, and Shockwave to Defy.

Gaming 
In 2006, Viacom acquired Harmonix, a video game studio oriented towards music video games and the original developer of the Guitar Hero franchise, for $175 million. The two subsequently collaborated on the creation of Rock Band. That year, Viacom also acquired the gaming–oriented communications platform Xfire.

In 2010, Harmonix was divested to an investment firm to become an independent studio, and Xfire was sold.

In 2011, Viacom established a short–lived, in–house development studio known as 345 Games, which was dedicated primarily to developing games based on Comedy Central, MTV and Spike properties.

Units

Paramount International Networks 

Paramount International Networks is the sibling division of Paramount Media Networks. Its headquarters are in New York, London, Warsaw, and Buenos Aires, and manages the following brands: MTV, Nickelodeon, Comedy Central, VH1, Channel 5, Network 10, Telefe, Chilevisión, TeleColombia and Colors.

The division is split into three regional units:

 Paramount Networks UK & Australia
 Ten Network Holdings
 Paramount Networks EMEAA
 Paramount Networks Northern Europe
 Paramount Networks Southern Europe, Middle East, and Africa
 Viacom 18 (49%)
 Paramount Networks Americas

Former brands include TMF and VIVA which, along with digital properties Nitrome Limited, Shockwave, Addicting Games, Atom Films and Xfire, have either since merged with other networks, were shut down, or were sold off.

MTV Entertainment Group 

MTV Entertainment Group is a subsidiary of Paramount Media Networks and serves as the holdings company for MTV, Pop TV, CMT, Paramount Network, Comedy Central, TV Land, Logo TV, Smithsonian Channel, and its Studios.

 MTV Entertainment Studios
 Comedy Partners
 MTV Animation
 MTV Documentary Films
 Smithsonian Networks Inc.
 Spike Cable Networks, Inc.
 Pop Media Group, LLC
 MTV
 MTV2
 MTV Classic
 MTV Live
 MTVU
 Tr3s
 Comedy Central
 Comedy Central Now
 Comedy Central Records
 South Park Digital Studios (joint venture with Trey Parker and Matt Stone)
 CMT
 CMT Canada (10%)
 CMT Music
 Logo
 SnowGlobe Music Festival
 Paramount Network
 Pop TV
 Smithsonian Channel
 United Kingdom
 Canada (6.67% minority stake; joint venture with Blue Ant Media)
 TV Land

 In 2022, MTV Entertainment Group partnered up with Second Chance Studios to launch Media careers.

Premium Networks Group 

Showtime Networks Inc. is a subsidiary of Paramount Media Networks that oversees the company's premium cable television channels, including its flagship service Showtime.

 Showtime
 The Movie Channel
 Flix

Kids & Family Entertainment 

 Nickelodeon
 Nick at Nite
 Nick Jr.
 Nicktoons
 TeenNick
 NickMusic
 Nick.com
 NickOnBoard
 Nickelodeon Productions
 Nickelodeon Animation Studio
 Avatar Studios
 Nickelodeon Digital
 Nickelodeon Velocity
 Paws, Inc.
 Awesomeness
 Awesomeness Ink
 Awesomeness Films
 Awesomeness News
 VidCon

Notes

References 

 
Mass media companies established in 1977
Cable network groups in the United States
Television broadcasting companies of the United States
Domestic Media Networks
Peabody Award winners
Companies based in New York City
American companies established in 1977
1986 mergers and acquisitions